, also spelt Zenzo Shimidzu, was a Japanese tennis player.

Shimizu graduated from the Tokyo Higher Commerce School (now Hitotsubashi University). In 1912 he started to work for Mitsui & Co. He married the daughter of Sohōka. He resided in Calcutta and New York. In 1929 he was transferred to Mitsui Life Insurance Co., became the manager of Kobe Branch, in 1945 the director thereof and also therefore was expelled from his official position after World War II. He was running a trading company in Kobe thereafter. In 1965 he collapsed from a stroke. In 1977 he died in Osaka at the age of 86.

While having this educational background and career he reached the All-Comers final of the Wimbledon Championships in 1920, where he lost to Bill Tilden 4–6, 4–6, 11–13. At the 1921 Wimbledon Championships he reached the semifinal which he lost to Manuel Alonso in five sets. He also was a member of Japan's Davis Cup team that finished second to United States in 1921. In 1921 he won the singles title at the Queen's Club Championships by defeating Mohammed Sleem in the final in straight sets. He established the earliest period of Japanese tennis together with Ichiya Kumagae (accurately speaking, Kumagai).

Shimizu was ranked World No. 4 by A. Wallis Myers of The Daily Telegraph in 1921.

Zenzo Shimizu (清水善三) (the same pronunciation but different Kanji comparing with Zenzo of this article, 善造) who is an ex-actor is his grandson.

Playing style
Shimizu was mainly a baseline player. His forehand grip was described as 'faulty' but nevertheless his passing shots, which he hit low and with topspin, were judged as excellent. Shimizu's backhand was orthodox and played with force from the baseline. His service was hit at shoulder height with precision and reverse twist but without great speed. His forehand volleys were comparatively weak but his backhand volleys and his smash were first-class. In his book The Art of Lawn Tennis Bill Tilden describes Shimuzu as a baseline player and marvelous court coverer with an uncanny accuracy in his shots. In comparing Shimuzu to his countryman Kumagae he states that Shimizu had a superior backhand and low volleying skills but lacked Kumagae's forehand drive and had a weaker service. Their high volleying skills and overheads were judged equal.

References

External links 
 
 
 
 History of 1920's Tennis

1891 births
1977 deaths
Hitotsubashi University alumni
Japanese male tennis players
People from Takasaki, Gunma
Sportspeople from Gunma Prefecture